Divan Group is a hotel group based in Turkey; its flagship is the Divan Istanbul next to Taksim Gezi Park. Founded in 1956, it is part of the Koç family's Koç Holding. In 2015 the Group had 15 hotels in Turkey, Iraq, Azerbaijan, and Georgia, with 6 more hotels in pipeline and plans to expand overseas to locations including New York City and London. It is affiliated to the Preferred Hotel Group.

The Group also includes Divan Residence (apartment management) and Divan Patisseries.

References

External links 

 Website

Hotel chains in Turkey
Hospitality companies established in 1956
Companies based in Istanbul
Turkish brands
Koç family
Şişli
Turkish companies established in 1956